Valentina Serghei (born February 14, 1948) is a Romanian sprint canoer who competed in the late 1960s. She finished fourth in the K-2 500 m event at the 1968 Summer Olympics in Mexico City.

References
Sports-reference.com profile

External links

1948 births
Canoeists at the 1968 Summer Olympics
Living people
Olympic canoeists of Romania
Romanian female canoeists
Place of birth missing (living people)